Call of Duty 2: Big Red One is a first-person shooter video game developed by Treyarch and High Voltage Software and published by Activision for GameCube, PlayStation 2 and Xbox. It is a side-story of the original game Call of Duty 2, which was released on PC and Xbox 360 in the same year.

Big Red One differs from other games in the Call of Duty franchise in that it focuses on a single Allied formation in World War II: the U.S. Army's 1st Infantry Division, which goes by the nickname Big Red One due to their unit patch which features a large, red number one. The game covers the division's part in the North Africa Campaign, the invasion of Sicily, the landing on Omaha Beach in Europe and moving east, and eventually crossing the Siegfried Line into Germany. Each chapter is book-ended with period footage from the Military Channel, with voiceovers courtesy of Mark Hamill (who appeared in the Sam Fuller film The Big Red One), imitating a World War II documentary.

The game features several actors from the HBO miniseries Band of Brothers, including Michael Cudlitz, James Madio, Frank John Hughes, Richard Speight Jr., Ross McCall, Rick Gomez, and Rene L. Moreno. The box cover features actor Stephen Saux. The story and characters were written by Aaron Ginsburg and Wade McIntyre.

In North America, it was later released as part of a compilation pack entitled Call of Duty: Legacy for the PlayStation 2 only. The pack included Call of Duty: Finest Hour and Big Red One.
A Collector's Edition was also released for both the Xbox and PlayStation 2.

Gameplay 
Call of Duty 2: Big Red One is a first-person shooter that has a single-player story mode and a multiplayer mode. The player takes on the role of a soldier protagonist named Roland Roger in specific missions during World War II from the perspective of the American 1st Infantry Division. The player can crouch and lie prone, and is able to scale low walls and other obstacles. Two firearms can be carried, which can be swapped with those left on the battlefield, and both fragmentation and smoke grenades can also be carried. A gun's iron sights can be used to aim more accurately. A compass on the heads-up display (HUD) shows both allies: (United States Army/Big Red One, United States Army Air Forces and United States Navy) and enemies: (Wehrmacht/Waffen-SS or Afrika Korps, Luftwaffe, Kriegsmarine, Armistice Army and Royal Italian Army), and objective markers to indicate locations the player must reach, areas to defend, or enemy cannons or tanks that the player must plant explosives on to disable. Emplaced weapons such as machine guns and flak cannons are available in some locations to take out enemy forces. In addition, some missions place the player in control of a tank. In one mission, the player assumes the role of Roger's brother "Stretch", a crewman on a United States Army Air Forces B-24 Liberator, and acts as a bombardier and gunner.

Reception 

According to review aggregator Metacritic, the game received "generally favorable" reviews from critics.

The PlayStation 2 version of Big Red One received a "Platinum" sales award from the Entertainment and Leisure Software Publishers Association (ELSPA), indicating sales of at least 300,000 copies in the United Kingdom.

References

External links 
 
 Call of Duty 2: Big Red One at MobyGames

2005 video games
Activision games
2: Big Red One
First-person shooters
Interactive Achievement Award winners
Multiplayer and single-player video games
Multiplayer online games
GameCube games
PlayStation 2 games
Treyarch games
Video games scored by Graeme Revell
Video games set in Algeria
Video games set in Belgium
Video games set in France
Video games set in Germany
Video games set in Italy
Video games set in Sicily
Video games set in Tunisia
Xbox games
High Voltage Software games
Video games developed in the United States